Yeletsky (masculine), Yeletskaya (feminine), or Yeletskoye (neuter) may refer to:
Yeletsky District, a district of Lipetsk Oblast, Russia
Yeletsky (inhabited locality) (Yeletskaya, Yeletskoye), name of several inhabited localities in Russia
Yeletsky (family), a princely family of Rurikid stock